The Robert Morris Colonials women's ice hockey program represents Robert Morris University. The Colonials competed in the College Hockey America conference. The program was suspended, along with the Men's team, after an announcement by the university on May 26, 2021. On December 17, 2021, it was announced both programs were going to be reinstated for the 2023-24 season.

History

March 31, 2004:  Robert Morris University announced that an NCAA Division I women's ice hockey team would compete, in the College Hockey America (CHA) Conference, starting with the 2005–06 season.

Kevin McGonagle was named the first head coach, but following a 1–7–0 start he was dismissed[2]. Assistant coach Jody Katz[1] was named the interim head coach for the rest of the season, and men's assistant coach Nate Handrahan was named new head coach for the 2006–07 campaign. 

Nate Handrahan was head coach for five years from the 2006–07 through the 2010–11 seasons.  He successfully built a stable program, bringing talented players into the program who would excel after his tenure. and amassed a 52–111–14 record, before taking the head coaching job of the Ohio State women's hockey program.

Paul Colontino was named head coach for the 2011–12 season, and remains in the position. He made the Colonials a competitive team, finishing with more wins than losses in 5 of 6 years.  In his first year, Colontino led the Colonials to their first CHA Tournament championship.  As the CHA had not automatic berth in the NCAA tournament at the time, their CHA win ended their season. 

The most successful season for the Colonials was the 2016–17 season. Their 24–5–6 record (15–3–2 in the CHA) earned them their first year-ending ranking, 8th, in both the USCHO and USA Today polls.  They won the CHA regular season championship for the first time, and took the Tournament Championship as well, to earn their first entry to the NCAA national championship.  They were defeated by top ranked Wisconsin 0–7 in the first round of the NCAA Tournament. Colonials forward Jaycee Gebhard scored 44 points on the season, making her the highest scoring first year player in the country for the season. Brittany Howard became the first Colonial player to be named CHA Player of the Year.

The Colonials went on to finish at the top of the CHA standings in 2017-18 and 2018-19, marking three years in a row that they won the regular season championship. They went to four straight championship games, ending the season as conference runner up in 2018, 2019 and 2020.

Over the course of four seasons (2016-20), the Colonials posted an overall record of 62-22-12 (.777 points percentage), including the program's first ever NCAA Tournament appearance in 2017.  The program qualified for the 2021 NCAA National Collegiate Women's Ice Hockey Tournament, ranked as the #8 seed. 

On February 3, 2022 Logan Bittle was named the head coach for when the team will return in the 2023-2024 season

Year by year

Awards and honors
Brittany Howard, 2018 Dapper Dan Sportswoman of the Year
Brittany Howard, 2017-18 Second Team All-America
Brittany Howard, 2016-17 CHA Player of the Year
Kirsten Welsh, 2017-18 CHA Defender of the Year
Jaycee Gebhard, 2017-18 CHA Rookie of the Year
Jaycee Gebhard, 2017-18 Women's Hockey Commissioners Association National Rookie of the Year
Paul Colontino, 2016-17 CHA Coach of the Year
Paul Colontino, 2011-12 USCHO Women's Coach of the Year
Paul Colontino, 2011-12 CHA Coach of the Year
Lexi Templeman: 2021 College Hockey America All-Conference First Team

Colonials in professional hockey

International

Olympians

See also
Robert Morris Colonials men's ice hockey
List of college women ice hockey coaches with 250 wins

References

Ice hockey teams in Pennsylvania